Lactura is a genus of moths in the family Lacturidae.

Selected species
Lactura aglaodora (Turner, 1942)
Lactura calliphylla (Turner, 1903)
Lactura caminaea (Meyrick, 1887)
Lactura cristata (Butler, 1886)
Lactura dives (Walker, 1854)
Lactura erythocera (R. Felder & Rogenhofer, 1875)
Lactura erythractis (Meyrick, 1887)
Lactura haplochroa (Turner, 1932)
Lactura laetifera (Walker, 1865)
Lactura leucophthalma (Meyrick, 1907)
Lactura mactata (R. Felder & Rogenhofer, 1875)
Lactura panopsia (Turner, 1926)
Lactura parallela (Meyrick, 1889)
Lactura phoenobapta (Turner, 1903)
Lactura pilcheri (T.P. Lucas, 1891)
Lactura pteropoecila (Turner, 1913)
Lactura pyrilampis (Meyrick, 1886)
Lactura pyronympha Meyrick, 1923
Lactura rhodomochla (Turner, 1942)
Lactura rubritexta (Meyrick, 1913)
Lactura sapotearum (Swainson, 1851)
Lactura thiospila (Turner, 1903)

References

 , 1995: Lacturidae, new family (Lepidoptera: Zygaenoidea). Tropical Lepidoptera Research 6 (2): 146-148. Full article: .

Zygaenoidea
Zygaenoidea genera